Desmethylsibutramine (BTS-54354) is an active metabolite of the anorectic drug sibutramine. It is a more potent monoamine reuptake inhibitor than sibutramine and has been sold as an ingredient in weight loss products sold as dietary supplements, along with related compounds such as the N-ethyl and 3,4-dichloro derivatives.

See also 
 α-PHiP
 4-Chloro-alpha-pyrrolidinovalerophenone
 Isohexylone
 Venlafaxine

References 

Anorectics
Chlorobenzenes
Cyclobutanes
Phenethylamines
Serotonin–norepinephrine–dopamine reuptake inhibitors
Stimulants
Substituted amphetamines